Although the eastern United States is not as seismically active as regions near plate boundaries, large and damaging earthquakes do occur there.  Furthermore, when these rare eastern U.S. earthquakes occur, the areas affected by them are much larger than for western U.S. earthquakes of the same magnitude. Thus, earthquakes represent at least a moderate hazard to East Coast cities, including New York City and adjacent areas of very high population density. A 2003 report notes that Brooklyn has the largest number of unreinforced brick buildings, and also notes that much of the NYC waterfront is reclaimed wetland posing soil liquefaction risks in areas like the JFK airport, Chinatown and the Upper East Side. A 2008 study from Columbia University found that the New York area was at "substantially greater" risk of a 6 or 7 magnitude earthquake than was previously thought.

Seismicity is scattered throughout most of the New York metropolitan area, with some hint of a concentration of earthquakes in the area surrounding Manhattan Island. The largest known earthquake in this region occurred in 1884 and had a magnitude of approximately 5. For this earthquake, observations of fallen bricks and cracked plaster were reported from eastern Pennsylvania to central Connecticut, and the maximum intensity reported was at two sites in western Long Island (Jamaica, New York and Amityville, New York).  Two other earthquakes of approximately magnitude 5 occurred in this region in 1737 and 1783. 

The map shows earthquakes of magnitude 3 and greater that occurred in this region from 1924 to 2010, along with locations of the larger earthquakes that occurred in 1737, 1783 and 1884. There were some disruptions, including building evacuations and delays at airports, while Amtrak train service at Penn Station was also delayed.

Background 
The New York City area is part of the geologically complex structure of the northern Appalachian Mountains. This complex structure was formed during the past half billion years when the Earth's crust underlying the Northern Appalachians was the site of two major geological episodes, each of which has left its imprint on the area's bedrock. Between about 450 million years ago and about 250 million years ago, the Northern Appalachian region was affected by a continental collision, in which the ancient African continent collided with the ancient North American continent to form the supercontinent Pangaea. Beginning about 200 million years ago, the present-day Atlantic Ocean began to form as plate tectonic forces began to rift apart the continent of Pangaea. The last major episode of geological activity to affect the bedrock in the New York area occurred about 100 million years ago, during the Mesozoic era, when continental rifting that led to the opening of the present-day Atlantic Ocean formed the Hartford and Newark Mesozoic rift basins.

Earthquake rates in the northeastern United States are about 50 to 200 times lower than in California, but the earthquakes that do occur in the northeastern U.S. are typically felt over a much broader region than earthquakes of the same magnitude in the western U.S. This means the area of damage from an earthquake in the northeastern U.S. could be larger than the area of damage caused by an earthquake of the same magnitude in the western U.S. The cooler rocks in the northeastern U.S. contribute to the seismic energy propagating as much as ten times further than in the warmer rocks of California. A magnitude 4.0 eastern U.S. earthquake typically can be felt as far as 100 km (60 mi) from its epicenter, but it infrequently causes damage near its source. A magnitude 5.5 eastern U.S. earthquake, although uncommon, can be felt as far as 500 km (300 mi) from its epicenter, and can cause damage as far away as 40 km (25 mi) from its epicenter. Earthquakes stronger than about magnitude 5.0 generate ground motions that are strong enough to be damaging in the epicentral area.

At well-studied plate boundaries like the San Andreas fault system in California, scientists can often make observations that allow them to identify the specific fault on which an earthquake took place. In contrast, east of the Rocky Mountains this is rarely the case. The New York City area is far from the boundaries of the North American plate, which are in the center of the Atlantic Ocean, in the Caribbean Sea, and along the west coast of North America. The seismicity of the northeastern U.S. is generally considered to be due to ancient zones of weakness that are being reactivated in the present-day stress field. In this model, pre-existing faults that were formed during ancient geological episodes persist in the intraplate crust, and the earthquakes occur when the present-day stress is released along these zones of weakness. The stress that causes the earthquakes is generally considered to be derived from present-day rifting at the Mid-Atlantic ridge.

Faults in the Northeastern U.S. 
The northeastern United States has many known faults, but virtually all of the known faults have not been active for perhaps 90 million years or more.  Also, the locations of the known faults are not well determined at earthquake depths.  Accordingly, few (if any) earthquakes in the region can be unambiguously linked to known faults. Given the current geological and seismological data, it is difficult to determine whether a known fault in this region is still active today and could produce a modern earthquake. As in most other areas east of the Rocky Mountains, the best guide to earthquake hazard in the northeastern U.S. is probably the locations of the past earthquakes themselves.

New York City-area faults 

The Ramapo Fault, which marks the western boundary of the Newark rift basin, has been argued to be a major seismically active feature of this region, but it is difficult to discern the extent to which the Ramapo fault (or any other specific mapped fault in the area) might be any more of a source of future earthquakes than any other parts of the region. The Ramapo Fault zone spans more than 185 miles (300 kilometers) in New York, New Jersey, and Pennsylvania. It is a system of faults between the northern Appalachian Mountains and Piedmont areas to the east. This fault is perhaps the best known fault zone in the Mid-Atlantic region, and some small earthquakes have been known to occur in its vicinity. Recently, public knowledge about the fault has increased – especially after the 1970s, when the fault's proximity to the Indian Point nuclear plant in New York was noticed.

There is insufficient evidence to demonstrate unequivocally any strong correlation of earthquakes in the New York City area with specific faults or other geologic structures in this region. The damaging earthquake affecting New York City in 1884 was probably not associated with the Ramapo fault because the strongest shaking from that earthquake occurred on Long Island (quite far from the trace of the Ramapo fault). The relationship between faults and earthquakes in the New York City area is currently understood to be more complex than any simple association of a specific earthquake with a specific mapped fault.

A 2008 study argued that a magnitude 6 or 7 earthquake might originate from the Ramapo fault zone, which would almost definitely spawn hundreds or even thousands of fatalities and billions of dollars in damage. Studying around 400 earthquakes over the past 300 years, the study also argued that there was an additional fault zone extending from the Ramapo Fault zone into southwestern Connecticut. As can be seen in the above figure of seismicity, earthquakes are scattered throughout this region, with no particular concentration of activity along the Ramapo fault, or along the hypothesized fault zone extending into southwestern Connecticut.

Just off the northern terminus of the Ramapo fault is the Indian Point Nuclear Power Plant, built between 1956 and 1960 by Consolidated Edison Company. The plant operated from 1963 until 2021, and it has been the subject of a controversy over concerns that an earthquake from the Ramapo fault will affect the power plant. Whether the Ramapo fault actually does pose a threat to this nuclear power plant remains an open question.

References 

Geology of New York (state)
Geology of New Jersey
Geology of Pennsylvania
Earthquakes in the United States
Seismic faults of the United States